The 2021 Phillip Island Trophy is a tournament on the 2021 WTA Tour, one of six events in the 2021 Melbourne Summer Series. It was played on outdoor hard courts in Melbourne, Australia. It was organised as a lead-up tournament to the 2021 Australian Open, and was held at the same venue, due to other tournaments in Australia being cancelled as a result from the COVID-19 pandemic. This tournament took place simultaneously with the second week of the 2021 Australian Open.

Champions

Singles

  Daria Kasatkina def.  Marie Bouzková 4–6, 6–2, 6–2

Doubles

  Ankita Raina /  Kamilla Rakhimova def.  Anna Blinkova /  Anastasia Potapova 2–6, 6–4, [10–7]

Points and prize money

Point distribution

Prize money

*per team

Singles main-draw entrants

Seeds

a Rankings are as of 8 February 2021

Other entrants
The following players received wildcards into the singles main draw:
  Destanee Aiava
  Bianca Andreescu
  Kimberly Birrell 
  Olivia Gadecki
  Sofia Kenin

The following players used a protected ranking to enter the singles main draw:
  Katie Boulter
  Zhu Lin

The following players received entry from the qualifying draw:
  Mona Barthel
  Mihaela Buzărnescu
  Lizette Cabrera
  Francesca Jones
  Varvara Lepchenko
  Rebecca Marino
  Ankita Raina
  Kamilla Rakhimova

The following players received entry as lucky losers:
  Gabriella Da Silva-Fick
  Monica Niculescu
  Lesia Tsurenko

Withdrawals
Before the tournament
  Ekaterina Alexandrova → replaced by  Lesia Tsurenko
  Amanda Anisimova → replaced by  Ajla Tomljanović
  Catherine Bellis → replaced by  Daria Kasatkina
  Belinda Bencic → replaced by  Nao Hibino
  Jennifer Brady → replaced by  Zhu Lin
  Fiona Ferro → replaced by  Lauren Davis
  Coco Gauff → replaced by  Danka Kovinić
  Polona Hercog → replaced by  Irina-Camelia Begu
  Madison Keys → replaced by  Anna Blinkova
  Johanna Konta → replaced by  Gabriella Da Silva-Fick
  Veronika Kudermetova → replaced by  Zarina Diyas
  Svetlana Kuznetsova → replaced by  Christina McHale
  Ons Jabeur → replaced by  Madison Brengle
  Magda Linette → replaced by  Misaki Doi
  Elise Mertens → replaced by  Katie Boulter
  Kristina Mladenovic → replaced by  Aliaksandra Sasnovich
  Garbiñe Muguruza → replaced by  Ana Bogdan
  Jeļena Ostapenko → replaced by  Varvara Gracheva
  Yulia Putintseva → replaced by  Wang Yafan
  Alison Riske → replaced by  Anastasia Potapova
  Elena Rybakina → replaced by  Andrea Petkovic
  Laura Siegemund → replaced by  Greet Minnen
  Barbora Strýcová → replaced by  Tímea Babos
  Iga Świątek → replaced by  Liudmila Samsonova
  Donna Vekić → replaced by  Maddison Inglis
  Markéta Vondroušová → replaced by  Sara Errani
  Heather Watson → replaced by  Elisabetta Cocciaretto
  Dayana Yastremska → replaced by  Sara Sorribes Tormo
  Zhang Shuai → replaced by  Monica Niculescu

During the tournament
  Sara Sorribes Tormo

Retirements
  Zarina Diyas
  Danka Kovinić
  Patricia Maria Țig

Doubles main-draw entrants

Seeds 

b Rankings are as of 8 February 2021.

Other entrants
The following pair received a wildcard into the doubles main draw:
  Destanee Aiava /  Charlotte Kempenaers-Pocz

Withdrawals
During the tournament
  Kimberly Birrell /  Olivia Gadecki
  Misaki Doi /  Nao Hibino
  Marie Bouzková /  Sara Sorribes Tormo

References

External links

Phillip Island Trophy
Phillip Island Trophy
Phillip Island Trophy
Phillip Island Trophy